Pissonotus basalis is a species of delphacid planthopper in the family Delphacidae. It is found in North America.

References

Further reading

 

Articles created by Qbugbot
Insects described in 1897
Delphacini